The Student Union of Tampere University (commonly known by the acronym TREY) is a Finnish student union that was formed in the fusion of The Student Union of Tampere University of Technology and The Student Union of the University of Tampere. As a student union, the purpose of TREY is to defend student interests in Tampere. TREY protects the interests of students, facilitates the work of student associations, provides services for its members as well as creates a sense of community.

The Chair of Board of the Student Union in 2023 is Anniina Honkasaari and the Chair of the Council of Representatives is Lauri Ahlqvist.

Organisation 
TREY's membership includes all the undergraduate student who study at Tampere University. The number of members is 18,000 making TREY the second largest student union in Finland. Doctoral and exchange students at Tampere University can choose to join the student union, as well. Students become members of TREY by paying the membership fee and registering at the university. In total, TREY has approximately 18,000 members, who study in Tampere, Turku, Pori and Seinäjoki.

In the organisation of the student union, the highest decision-making power belongs to the Council of Representatives, who are elected from among the members every two years in representative elections. The council appoints the Executive Board, which decides on the day-to-day operations of the student union. For the purpose of providing daily services and doing long-term advocacy work, the student union employs a number of specialists and office staff.

Operations

Advocacy 
The student union promotes the interests of its members, especially at Tampere University and the City of Tampere, but also in the Finnish society. The student union has policy outlines decided by the Council of Representatives, within the framework of which advocacy work is carried out. Advocacy work happens in different sectors, such as educational affairs, social affairs and international affairs. Advocacy work is also done in cooperation with student associations.

Associations 
Over 150 associations operate within TREY. Advocacy associations operate on the faculty level, and their members are other associations. The advocacy associations supervise the interests of their faculty’s students, organise training for their member associations and build community spirit 66 within the faculty. Subject associations with student intake are consortiums of students of certain subjects or fields, which advocate for their members in the degree programmes and organise free-time activities for the students. They also organise tutoring together with the student union and the university. The subject associations in engineering fields are called guilds. Other subject associations are subject associations that don’t have student intake. They do the same things as the other subject associations, but you can usually become a member when you know your area of specialisation. Most associations within TREY are hobby associations that operate on the basis of a hobby, interest or conviction. Vocational clubs are hobby associations dedicated to specific fields. Vocational clubs maintain relationships between students, institutions and companies in the field in a manner very similar to subject associations without student intake.

Student associations and guilds with student intake 

 Tampereen yliopiston filosofian opiskelijoiden ainejärjestö Aatos
 Automaatiotekniikan kilta Autek
 Bioteekkarikilta Bioner
 Bioteknologian opiskelijoiden ainejärjestö Biopsi ry
 Tampereen yliopiston kauppatieteiden opiskelijat - Boomi ry
 MDP in Leadership for Change students Complex ry
 Tampereen psykologian opiskelijoiden ainejärjestö Cortex ry
 Teknis-luonnontieteellinen kilta Hiukkanen
 Tampereen yliopiston politiikan tutkimuksen ainejärjestö Iltakoulu ry
 Tuotantotalouden kilta Indecs ry
 Tampereen yliopiston sosiaalitieteiden ja yhteiskuntatutkimuksen opiskelijoiden aineyhdistys Interaktio ry
 Tampereen yliopiston varhaiskasvatuksen opiskelijoiden ainejärjestö ITU ry
 Tampereen yliopiston suomen kielen opiskelijoiden ainejärjestö Kopula ry
 Koneenrakentajakilta KoRK
 Tampereen yliopiston vieraiden kielten opiskelijoiden ainejärjestö Lexica ry
 Tampereen yliopiston matematiikan, tilastotieteen ja tietojenkäsittelytieteiden opiskelijoiden ainejärjestö Luuppi ry
 Tietojohtajakilta Man@ger
 Tampereen yliopiston kasvatustieteen ja aikuiskasvatuksen ainejärjestö Mentor ry
 Materiaali-insinöörikilta MIK
 Teatterityön tutkinto-ohjelma Näty
 Tampereen yliopiston luokanopettajaksi opiskelevien ainejärjestö OKA ry
 Tampereen yliopiston historianopiskelijat Patina ry
 Porin Teekkarit - PoTka ry
 Tampereen yliopiston puheviestinnän opiskelijoiden ainejärjestö Reettorit ry
 Tampere International Global Society Students (TIPSY)
 Tampereen yliopiston terveystieteiden ainejärjestö Salus ry
 Sähkökilta ry, Skilta
 Tampereen yliopiston sosiaalityön opiskelijoiden ainejärjestö SOS ry
 Tampereen yliopiston hallintotieteitä opiskelevien ainejärjestö Staabi ry
 Tampereen Arkkitehtikilta TamArk
 Tampereen Rakentajakilta TARAKI
 TaSciEn - Tampere Science and Engineering Students' association ry
 Tampereen yliopiston kirjallisuuden opiskelijoiden ainejärjestö Teema ry
 Tampereen TietoTeekkarikilta TiTe
 Tampereen Lääketieteen Kandidaattiseura ry
 Tampereen yliopiston käännöstieteen opiskelijoiden ainejärjestö Transla ry
 Tampereen yliopiston informaatiotutkimuksen ja mediatutkimuksen opiskelijat UDK ry
 Tampereen yliopiston Porin yksikön opiskelijoiden ainejärjestö Utopia ry
 Tampereen yliopiston journalistiikan ja visuaalisen journalismin opiskelijoiden ainejärjestö Vostok ry
 Ympäristöteekkarikilta ry, YKI
 Tampereen yliopiston logopedian opiskelijoiden ainejärjestö Ääni ry

Member services 
The member services provided by the student union are accessible to all members and associations. The member services include, among other things, a student card, rental services (vans, sports equipment and games), and counselling services.

Tutoring 
Tampere University is responsible for student tutoring, but TREY is tasked with responsibilities such as organising tutor recruitment and tutor training. TREY is actively in contact with the tutoring organisers and international organisers in subject associations.

Student union magazine Visiiri 
The student union funds the student union magazine Visiiri. Visiiris printed media publishes six times per year and it has a website, as well.

Biggest Wappu in Finland 
Due to its large size, TREY is the organizer of Finland biggest vappu celebration (May 1 celebration for students) with over 100 events spanning for over two weeks.

References

External links
 

Tampere University
Tampere University
Tampere